Wilder Maker is an American indie rock band from Brooklyn, New York, formed in 2014. The band consists of Gabriel Birnbaum (guitar and vocals), Katie Von Schleicher (keyboards, guitar, vocals), Nick Jost (bass), Sean Mullins (drums) and Adam Brisbin (guitar). They have released one full-length album and two EPs.

History 
Wilder Maker began releasing music in 2014 with a self-released EP entitled Everyday Crimes Against Objects of Desire. The EP was premiered by Stereogum. In 2017, Wilder Maker signed with Saddle Creek and released the single "New Streets." The release brought wider attention to the band and Spin Magazine called the single "unambiguously catchy, offering the band’s idiosyncratic perspective on the more silken side of ’70s radio rock." "Only Child," the b-side to "New Streets" was recorded by Bryan Pugh at Rubber Tracks in Brooklyn, and features the guitar work of Will Graefe of Okkervil River.

In 2018, Wilder Maker released their first full-length album entitled Zion. Following the release of Zion, Wilder Maker toured the United States, performing in more than 20 cities across the country. In 2019, Wilder Maker performed at Underwater Sunshine Festival in New York City.

Discography

Albums 
 Male Models (2022) - Western Vinyl
 Zion (2018) - Northern Spy

Singles and EPs 

 Rose Room/Love So Well (2019) - Northern Spy Records
 Infinite Shift/Black Wood Shine (2019) - Northern Spy Records
 New Streets (2017) - Saddle Creek
 Everyday Crimes Against Objects of Desire Vol. III (2015) - Self-released
 Everyday Crimes Against Objects of Desire Vol. II (2015) - Self-released
 Everyday Crimes Against Objects of Desire Vol. I (2014) - Self-released

References

External links 

 Official website

2014 establishments in New York City
Alternative rock groups from New York (state)
Indie rock musical groups from New York (state)
Saddle Creek Records artists
Musical groups established in 2014
Musical groups from Brooklyn
Musical quintets